Cyrtodactylus russelli is a species of gecko, a lizard in the family Gekkonidae. The species is endemic to Myanmar.

Etymology
The specific name, russelli, is in honor of Canadian herpetologist Anthony Patrick Russell (born 1947).

Geographic range
C. russelli is found in northern Myanmar, in Kachin State and Sagaing Region.

Habitat
The preferred natural habitat of C. russelli is forest.

Description
C. russelli is large for its genus.

Reproduction
C. russelli is oviparous.

References

Further reading
Bauer AM (2003). "Descriptions of Seven New Cyrtodactylus (Squamata: Gekkonidae) with a Key to the Species of Myanmar (Burma)". Proceedings of the California Academy of Sciences 54: 463–498. (Cyrtodactylus russelli, new species, pp. 482–486, Figures 12–14).

Cyrtodactylus
Reptiles described in 2003
Taxa named by Aaron M. Bauer